Maherchi Sadi is a 1991 Indian Marathi-language family drama film produced and directed by Vijay Kondke (Nephew of the late Marathi film legend, Dada Kondke). The film stars Alka Kubal, Usha Nadkarni, Ramesh Bhatkar, Vijay Chavan and Ajinkya Deo played pivotal roles. The film grossed ₹12 crore (US$1.5 million) in its first three months of release, making it the highest-grossing Marathi film of that time. 

Maherchi Sadi ran for more than two years at iconic Prabhat Talkies. It is a remake of the hugely successful Rajasthani film Bai Chali Sasariye (1988), which was also later remade in Hindi  as Saajan Ka Ghar in 1994 starring Juhi Chawla and Rishi Kapoor.

Cast

 Alka Kubal as Laxmi
 Ajinkya Deo as Vicky
 Ashalata as Laxmi's Stepmother 
 Ramesh Bhatkar as Laxmi's Husband 
 Vikram Gokhale as Yashwant/Laxmi's Father 
 Kishori Shahane as Vicky's Girlfriend 
 Vijay Chavan as Laxmi's Neighbour 
 Usha Nadkarni as Rukma 
 Jayshree Gadkar as Laxmi's Mother

Soundtrack
The film's soundtrack is composed by Anil Mohile.

Track list
Following table shows list of tracks and respective duration in the film.

References

External links 
  
 Maherchi Sadi at Rotten Tomatoes

1991 films
1990s Marathi-language films
Marathi remakes of Rajasthani films